Qarah Jeqqeh (also Romanized as Qareh Jaqqeh and Qareh Jeqqeh) is a village in Sudlaneh Rural District, in the Central District of Quchan County, Razavi Khorasan Province, Iran. As of the 2006 census, its population was 80, with there being 21 families.

References 

Populated places in Quchan County